Cornell 1964 is a live album by the Charles Mingus Sextet, featuring multi-instrumentalist Eric Dolphy. It was recorded at Cornell University in Ithaca, New York, on March 18, 1964. 

The recordings of this concert were thought to be lost for many years, until they were re-discovered by Mingus' widow Sue, and were subsequently released for the first time in 2007 on the Blue Note label, initially as a 2-CD set.

Track listing
All pieces composed by Charles Mingus, except where noted.

CD 1
"Opening" – 0:16
"ATFW You" (Byard) – 4:26
"Sophisticated Lady" (Ellington, Mills, Parish) – 4:23
"Fables of Faubus" – 29:41
"Orange Was the Colour of Her Dress, Then Blue Silk" - 15:05
"Take the 'A' Train" (Strayhorn) - 17:26

CD 2
"Meditations" - 31:23
"So Long Eric" - 15:33
"When Irish Eyes Are Smiling" (Olcott, Graff, Ball) - 6:06
"Jitterbug Waltz" (Waller) - 9:58

Personnel
Charles Mingus – double bass
Eric Dolphy – alto saxophone, bass clarinet, flute
Johnny Coles – trumpet
Clifford Jordan – tenor saxophone
Jaki Byard – piano
Dannie Richmond – drums

References

2007 live albums
Charles Mingus live albums
Eric Dolphy live albums
Blue Note Records live albums